Xenia of Yaroslavl (died in the 1290s), was a Princess of Yaroslavl by marriage to Prince Basil of Yaroslavl, and regent of Yaroslavl during the minority of her grandson prince Michael of Yaroslavl.   

Her origin is unknown.  She married Basil of Yaroslavl, and became the mother of Maria of Yaroslavl. Her daughter Maria married Theodore the Black, who was named the successor of his father-in-law.  In 1288, Theodore departed Yaroslavl to have his claims to rule confirmed by Khan Mengu-Timur.  During his absence, Xenia secured the support of the boyars and revolted, placing her grandson Michael on the throne with her and her daughter as co-regents during his minority.  Theodore was not able to secure his rule of Yaroslavl until after the death of Xenia, Maria and Michael.

References

13th-century women rulers
13th-century Russian people